Cristian Ojeda may refer to:

 Cristian Ojeda (footballer, born 1985), Colombian midfielder for Real Cartagena
 Cristian Ojeda (footballer, born 1999), Argentine midfielder for Talleres de Córdoba